Wolfers may refer to:

 Wolfers (hunting)
 Competitive eating, known commonly as wolfing

People 
 Arnold Wolfers
 Marcel Wolfers
 Philippe Wolfers